Toni Konui (born 6 November 1966) is a former rugby union player. She represented  at the 1998 Women's Rugby World Cup. She played for College Rifles and Auckland.

References

1966 births
Living people
New Zealand women's international rugby union players
New Zealand female rugby union players